The 1991 Volvo International was a men's tennis tournament played on outdoor hard courts at the Cullman-Heyman Tennis Center in New Haven, Connecticut in the United States and was part of the Championship Series of the 1991 ATP Tour. It was the 19th edition of the tournament and ran from August 12 through August 19, 1991. Petr Korda won the singles title.

Finals

Singles

 Petr Korda defeated  Goran Ivanišević 6–4, 6–2
 It was Korda's 1st title of the year and the 5th of his career.

Doubles

 Petr Korda /  Wally Masur defeated  Jeff Brown /  Scott Melville 7–5, 6–3
 It was Korda's 2nd title of the year and the 6th of his career. It was Masur's 3rd title of the year and the 17th of his career.

References

External links
 ITF tournament edition details

 
Volvo International
Volvo International
Volvo International
Volvo International